is a passenger railway station located in the city of Matsudo, Chiba Prefecture, Japan, operated by the private railway operator Shin-Keisei Electric Railway.

Lines
Minoridai Station is served by the Shin-Keisei Line, and is located 3.0 kilometers from the terminus of the line at Matsudo Station.

Station layout 
The station consists of dual opposed side platforms, connected by a footbridge.

Platforms

History
Minoridai Station was opened on April 21, 1955.

Passenger statistics
In fiscal 2018, the station was used by an average of 8785 passengers daily.

Surrounding area
Matsudo City Minoridai Civic Center
Matsudo City Library Minoridai Annex
Matsudo City No. 6 Junior High School
Matsudo City Minoridai Elementary School

See also
 List of railway stations in Japan

References

External links

 Shin Keisei Railway Station information 

Railway stations in Japan opened in 1955
Railway stations in Chiba Prefecture
Matsudo